Woodbridge Township may refer to the following places:

 Woodbridge Township, Michigan
 Woodbridge Township, New Jersey

See also 
Woodbridge (disambiguation)

Township name disambiguation pages